Salah Mohammed Abdah Tubaigy (born 20 August 1971), also spelled Tubaiqi, is a Saudi forensic doctor. He was the head of the Saudi Scientific Council of Forensics and a colonel in the armed forces of Saudi Arabia.

In 2019 Tubaigy was sentenced to death for his involvement in the assassination of Jamal Khashoggi.

Biography
Tubaigy was a professor in the criminal evidence department at Naif Arab University for Security Sciences in Riyadh, and was known for pioneering rapid and mobile autopsies. He taught and published papers on gathering DNA evidence and dissecting human bodies and had a prominent role in Saudi Arabia's state security apparatus and scientific community for around 20 years. He designed a mobile autopsy lab to accompany Muslims on the hajj to Mecca, and said it can "provide the dissection service to the authorities in a record time." For three months, from June 2015, he studied at the Victorian Institute of Forensic Medicine in Melbourne, Australia.

In 2018 Al Jazeera reported that Tubaigy was involved in the murder and dismembering of Jamal Khashoggi. A source said "Tubaigy began to cut Khashoggi’s body up on a table in the study while he was still alive... As he started to dismember the body, Tubaigy put on earphones and listened to music. He advised other members of the squad to do the same."

An official cited by The New York Times reportedly described a quick assassination, and dismemberment by a team of Saudi agents, with a bone saw brought for the purpose. "It is like Pulp Fiction," the official said.

Tubaigy served on the editorial board to the King Fahd Security College. In late October 2018, his name was removed from the publication's website.

In April 2019, as a response to the murder of Jamal Khashoggi, the United States banned Tubaigy and 15 others (including Saud al-Qahtani)  from entering the country.

On 23 December 2019, Tubaigy was one of five people sentenced to death for carrying out Khashoggi's killing. He was then pardoned by Khashoggi's children on May 20, 2020.

References

External links 
[https://www.democracynow.org/2018/10/26/does_saudi_forensic_doctor_who_allegedly Does Saudi Forensic Doctor Who Allegedly Dismembered Khashoggi] Have Ties to University of New Haven? Democracy Now!, 26 October 2018

Living people
1971 births
Saudi Arabian military personnel
Medical examiners
Forensic pathologists
Saudi Arabian pathologists
People convicted of murder by Saudi Arabia
Alumni of the University of Glasgow
King Faisal University alumni
Saudi Arabian prisoners sentenced to death
Saudi Arabian people convicted of murder
People sanctioned under the Magnitsky Act